Borovoy (masculine) or Borovaya (feminine) is a Russian last name shared by the following people:

Alan Borovoy (1932–2015), Canadian lawyer
Alexei Borovoi (1875–1935), Russian philosopher, anarchist
Ari Borovoy (born 1979), Mexican singer of the OV7 pop group
Konstantin Borovoy (born 1948), Russian politician